Abdullah Saeed (born May 18, 1984) is a Pakistani-American producer, composer, journalist, host, writer, and comic. He produced and hosted several TV shows and documentaries for Vice.

Personal life
Saeed was born in New Hampshire to a Pakistani family. He grew up in Thailand, where his father worked at a college campus, and his mother is a nurse. He speaks both English and Urdu.

Career
Saeed began his career as a music journalist specializing in hip hop and electronic music. He has interviewed DJ Shadow, El-P, Flying Lotus, Thundercat, Kid Koala, Freddie Gibbs, Migos, The Chainsmokers, Zach Hill, Bonobo, and Siriusmo among others.

He wrote a weekly online column called Weediquette from 2012 to 2014 and produced and hosted the first episode of the web series of the same name. His works include the James Beard Award-nominated series Bong Appétit, for which he also composed the theme song, and the limited series Vice Does America on Viceland, as well as the Webby Award-winning documentary Mad Honey.

Saeed stopped making content for Vice Media in protest in 2017 in the wake of allegations that Vice tolerated an abusive workplace culture and sexual harassment, and their practice of making employees sign “non-traditional workplace agreements” to protect themselves from being sued by employees for issues arising from said workplace culture.

In 2019, Saeed was recognized by the Associated Press Television and Radio Association for his investigative reporting for KCRW on "seshes" or underground cannabis markets in Los Angeles.

Saeed is a former member of The Kominas and a current member of the band GOD$. He was a writer and actor on the HBO series High Maintenance and co-wrote a film with Ben Sinclair for Fox Searchlight and New Regency. He co-hosted the podcast Great Moments In Weed History with former High Times editor David Bienenstock.

In 2022, Onyx Collective ordered Saeed's pilot Deli Boys, starring Poorna Jagannathan and Iqbal Theba.

Views
Saeed is an advocate for cannabis liberalization and education. He describes his family as "pretty liberal and open minded”.

References

1984 births
Living people
American cannabis activists
American expatriates in Thailand
American people of Pakistani descent
American television hosts
American television producers
Male actors from New Hampshire